Sud-Est (English South East) is a development region in Romania. As with other development regions, it does not have any administrative powers, its main function being to co-ordinate regional development projects and manage funds from the European Union.

Counties
The region covers the Southeast part of the country, and it includes the old historical regions of Dobrudja, southern Moldavia, and northeastern Muntenia. The Sud-Est region is made up of the following counties:
Brăila (Muntenia)
Buzău (Muntenia)
Constanța (Dobrudja)
Galați (Moldavia)
Tulcea (Dobrudja)
Vrancea (Moldavia)

See also
Development regions of Romania
Nomenclature of Territorial Units for Statistics

References

Development regions of Romania